Staříč is a municipality and village in the Frýdek-Místek District in the Moravian-Silesian Region of the Czech Republic. It has about 2,200 inhabitants.

Etymology
According to local historian Vincenc Prasek, the village was presumably named after a person called "Stařek" or "Stařík".

History
The first written mention of Staříč is from 1258.

References

External links

 

Villages in Frýdek-Místek District